The church of Sant'Antonio Abate is located in Parma, Italy.

History
Initial construction of a church at the site began in 1386 and ended in 1404, under the commission of Canons Regular of St. Anthony of Vienna. Under the commission of Cardinal Antonio Francesco Sanvitale and a donation by  Pope Clement XIII, in the 1700s the church was rebuilt to designs of the architect and decorator Ferdinando Galli-Bibiena. The church was reconsecrated in 1766.

Art
The interior contains decorations by the Paremesan painters Gaetano Ghidetti and Antonio Bresciani; the ceiling frescoes of Angels and the Apotheosis of St. Anthony and the main altarpiece are by Giuseppe Peroni.

The painting by Correggio, Madonna of St Jerome, was painted for this church. It had been removed to the Ducal palace by the 18th century, then looted and taken to Paris in 1796, but returned in 1814 and now is in Galleria nazionale di Parma.

The stucco sculptures in the niches around the altar are by Gaetano Callani  representing the Beatitudes.

This beautiful church has an unusual "two-layer" ceiling. "Holes" in the usual inner shell allow you to see through to a second, higher ceiling, with further paintings of heavenly bodies. (Only the five holes above the nave in the accompanying photograph are examples of this. The bright openings in the apse are merely normal windows.)

References

Antonio abate
Antonio
Baroque architecture in Parma